Faulkland is an unincorporated community in New Castle County, Delaware, United States, approximately two miles west of Wilmington.  Faulkland has only one main road, Faulkland Road.  No post office has ever existed in the very small community.  The Wilmington and Western Railroad runs parallel through the area with a level crossing at Faulkland Road. Hyde Run,  a Red Clay Creek tributary, runs through the area.

History
Faulkland's population was 300 in 1890, and 281 in 1900.

A newspaper, called The Faulkland Quiz, was published in the community during the 1890s.

References

Unincorporated communities in New Castle County, Delaware
Unincorporated communities in Delaware